Marie Françoise Gilot (born 26 November 1921) is a French painter, best known for her relationship with Pablo Picasso, with whom she had two children. Gilot was already launched as an accomplished artist, notably in watercolours and ceramics, but her professional career was eclipsed by her social celebrity, and when she split from Picasso, he discouraged galleries from buying her work, as well as unsuccessfully trying to block her 1964 memoir, Life with Picasso.

Early life 
Gilot was born in Neuilly-sur-Seine, France, to Émile Gilot and Madeleine Gilot (née Renoult). Her father was a businessman and agronomist, and her mother was a watercolor artist. Her father was a strict, well-educated man. Gilot began writing with her left hand as a young child, but at the age of four, her father forced her to write with her right hand. As a result, Gilot became ambidextrous. She decided at the age of five to become a painter. The following year her mother tutored her in art, beginning with watercolors and India ink. Gilot was then taught by her mother's art teacher, a Mademoiselle Meuge, for six years. She studied English literature at Cambridge University and the British Institute in Paris (now University of London Institute in Paris). While training to be a lawyer, Gilot was known to skip morning law classes to pursue her true passion: art. She graduated from the Sorbonne with a B.A. in Philosophy in 1938 and from Cambridge University with a degree in English in 1939. Gilot had her first exhibition of paintings in Paris in 1943.

School
Gilot's father Emile wanted his daughter to be just as educated as he, and as a result, oversaw his daughter's education very closely. Gilot was tutored at home, beginning at a young age, and by the time she was six years old, she had a good knowledge of Greek mythology. By the age of fourteen, she was reading books by Edgar Allan Poe, Charles Baudelaire, and Alfred Jarry. While her father had hoped she would go to school to become a scientist or lawyer, Gilot was frequenting museums in Europe to understand and gain an appreciation for the masters. When Gilot was seventeen, she attended the Sorbonne and the British Institute in Paris and had a baccalaureate degree in Philosophy. She received her English Literature degree from Cambridge University. During 1939, Gilot's father still wanted her to complete a degree in international law, and out of fear that Paris would be bombed during the war, Gilot was sent to Rennes, France, to begin law school. At the age of 19, she abandoned her studies in law to devote her life to art. She was mentored by the artist Endre Rozsda. In 1942, after abandoning law several times, and returning on the insistence of her father, Gilot studied law for a second year and passed her written exams, but failed her oral exams.

Picasso
At 21, Gilot met Pablo Picasso, then 61. Picasso first saw Gilot in a restaurant in the spring of 1943. Dora Maar, the photographer who was his muse and lover at the time, was devastated to learn that Picasso was replacing her with the much younger artist. After Picasso's and Gilot's meeting, she moved in with him in 1946. They spent almost ten years together, and those years revolved around art. He painted La femme-fleur, then his old friend Matisse, who liked Gilot, announced that he would create a portrait of her, in which her body would be pale blue and her hair leaf green.

It was believed by some art historians that Gilot's relationship with Picasso is what cut short her artistic career. When Gilot left Picasso, he told all art dealers he knew not to purchase her art, whereas Gilot herself has noted that continuing to identify her in relation to Picasso "does her a great disservice as an artist."

Picasso and Gilot never married, but they did have two children together because he promised to love and care for them. Their son, Claude, was born in 1947, and their daughter, Paloma, was born in 1949. During their ten years together, Gilot was often harassed on the streets of Paris by Picasso's legal wife, Olga Khokhlova, a former Russian ballet dancer, and Picasso himself physically abused her as well. In 1964, eleven years after their separation, Gilot wrote Life with Picasso (with the art critic Carlton Lake), a book that sold over one million copies in dozens of languages, despite an unsuccessful legal challenge from Picasso attempting to stop its publication. From then on, Picasso refused to see Claude or Paloma ever again. All the profits from the book were used to help Claude and Paloma mount a case to become Picasso's legal heirs.

Gilot's work

Françoise Gilot was introduced to art at a young age by her mother and grandmother. Her grandmother had held a party when Françoise was about five years old. A certain man caught Gilot's eye as being interesting, and she asked her grandmother who the man was. He turned out to be a painter, Emile Mairet. Gilot's father became close friends with the painter, and Françoise would often tag along to visit his studio. At age six, Françoise's mother began teaching her art, with the exception of drawing. Her mother believed artists become too dependent on erasers, and instead taught Françoise in watercolor and India ink. If she made a mistake, she would have to make it intentional to her work. By the age of thirteen, she began to study with Mlle. Meuge, which continued for six years. At the age of fourteen, she was introduced to ceramics, and a year later, she studied with the Post-Impressionist painter Jacques Beurdeley. At the age of 21, she met Picasso. Although Picasso had influenced Françoise Gilot's work as a cubist painter, she developed her own style. She avoided the sharp edges and angular forms that Picasso sometimes used. Instead, she used organic figures. During the war, Gilot's father attempted to save the most valuable household belongings by moving them, but the truck was bombed by the Germans, leading to the loss of Gilot's drawings and watercolors.

Her stature as an artist and the value of her work have increased over the years. In 2021 her painting Paloma à la Guitare, a 1965 portrait of her daughter, sold for $1.3 million at Sotheby's in London. As of January 2022 her work is on exhibit in multiple leading museums including the Metropolitan Museum of Art, the Museum of Modern Art, and the Centre Pompidou in Paris.

Personal life
From 1943 to 1953, Gilot was the lover and artistic muse of Pablo Picasso, with whom she had two children, Claude and Paloma.

Gilot married artist Luc Simon in 1955. Their daughter Aurélia was born the following year. The couple divorced in 1962.

In 1969, Gilot was introduced to American polio vaccine pioneer Jonas Salk at the home of mutual friends in La Jolla, California. Their shared appreciation of architecture led to a brief courtship and a 1970 wedding in Paris. During their marriage, which lasted until Salk's death in 1995, the couple lived apart for half of every year as Gilot continued to paint in New York City, La Jolla, and Paris.

Throughout the 1980s and 1990s, Gilot designed costumes, stage sets, and masks for productions at the Guggenheim in New York City. She was awarded a Chevalier de la Légion d'Honneur in 1990.

In 1973, Gilot was appointed art director of the scholarly journal Virginia Woolf Quarterly. In 1976, she joined the board of the Department of Fine Arts at the University of Southern California, where she taught summer courses and took on organizational responsibilities until 1983.

Gilot splits her time between New York and Paris, working on behalf of the Salk Institute, and continues to exhibit her work internationally.

In 2010, Gilot was awarded the Officer of the Légion d'honneur, the French government’s highest honour the arts.

In August 2018, Gilot released three sketchbooks, these documented the journey she went on in Venice, India and Senegal.

In popular culture
Gilot is played by Natascha McElhone in the 1996 film Surviving Picasso, and by Clémence Poésy in the 2018 season of Genius, which focuses on the life and art of Picasso.

Books
 Françoise Gilot and Carlton Lake, Life with Picasso, McGraw-Hill, 1964; Anchor Books/Doubleday, 1989, 
 Françoise Gilot, Le regard et son Masque, Paris: Calmann-Lévy, 1975,  – focuses on her development as an artist.
 Françoise Gilot, Interface: The Painter and the Mask, Press at California State University, Fresno, 1983
 Barbara Haskell, Françoise Gilot: An Artist's Journey 1943–1987, California State Univ, 1987, ; Little, Brown, 1989.
 Françoise Gilot, Matisse and Picasso: A Friendship in Art, Doubleday, 1990, ; New York: Anchor Books, 1992,

Sources
 Françoise Gilot, Mel Yoakum, Françoise Gilot: monograph 1940–2000, Acatos, 2000,

References

External links
 
 
 Françoise Gilot: Studio visit, TateShots, 19 December 2013
 "Picasso and Francoise Gilot: Paris-Vallauris, 1943–1953", Charlie Rose, 17 May 2012
 "An hour with French painter Francoise Gilot", Charlie Rose, 13 February 1998
 Françoise Gilot Collection at the Harry Ransom Center
 Francoise Gilot (1921–)
 Françoise Gilot on artnet

French women painters
French women writers
1921 births
Living people
French centenarians
Women centenarians
French artists' models
People from Neuilly-sur-Seine
Artists from San Diego
Chevaliers of the Légion d'honneur
Officers of the Ordre national du Mérite
People educated at the University of London Institute in Paris
Alumni of the University of Cambridge
University of Paris alumni
20th-century American women artists
21st-century American women artists
French memoirists
French expatriates in the United States
Muses
Pablo Picasso
French expatriates in the United Kingdom